The 2006–07 Russian Cup was the 15th edition of the Russian football knockout tournament since the dissolution of Soviet Union. The competition started on 13 April 2006 and finished on 27 May 2007, with the final played at the Luzhniki Stadium in Moscow, where Lokomotiv Moscow beat FC Moscow 1–0 at extra time.

Preliminary round
South

Center

West

First round
South

East

Center

Ural-Povolzhye

West

Second round
South

East

Center

Ural-Povolzhye

West

Third round
East

Ural-Povolzhye

Center

South

West

Fourth round

Round of 32

|}

First leg

Second leg

Round of 16

|}

First leg

Second leg

Quarter-finals

|}

First leg

Second leg

Semi-finals

|}

First leg

Second leg

Final
The final took place on 27 May 2007 at the Luzhniki Stadium in Moscow.

Top goalscorers

Notes

References

Russian Cup seasons
Russian Cup
Cup
Cup